Bria Skonberg is a Canadian jazz trumpeter and vocalist.

Early life
Skonberg was born in Chilliwack, British Columbia; her great-grandparents on her father's side came from Sweden. She took piano lessons in elementary school, switching to trumpet in her early teens. During High School and college she appeared at numerous jazz festivals with The 51st Eight. She also led the all-female Mighty Aphrodite Jazz Band.  In 2006, she graduated from Capilano University in Vancouver with a degree in jazz trumpet. She studied with Warren Vaché.

Career

Skonberg was the leader of Bria's Hot Five and The Big Bang Jazz Band. She also performed with Canadian jazz veteran Dal Richards and his Orchestra in concert and on recordings.

Skonberg has appeared as a band leader and guest artist at jazz festivals in North America, Europe, China and Japan. She moved to New York City in 2010. She was a co-founder of the New York Hot Jazz Festival.

Skonberg has performed with Bucky Pizzarelli, Howard Alden, and Wycliffe Gordon. Also with Shaye Cohn.

In 2017 Skonberg won the Juno Award for Vocal Jazz Album of the Year, for her crowd-funded album Bria.

Awards and honors
 Jazz Award of Merit, Canadian Broadcasting Corporation, 2006
 Kobe Jazz Street Award, Breda Jazz Festival, 2007
 Outstanding Jazz Artist, New York Bistro Award
 Nomination, Artist of the Year, Jazz Journalists Association, 2013
 Swing! Award, Jazz at Lincoln Center, 2015
 Winner, Juno Award Jazz Vocal Album, 2017

Discography
 Fresh (Lighter Than Air, 2009)
 So Is the Day (Random Act, 2012)
 Into Your Own (Random Act, 2014)
 Bria (Sony Masterworks, 2016)
 With a Twist (Sony, 2017)
 Nothing Never Happens (self-released, 2019)

References

External links 
 Official site

Living people
Canadian jazz trumpeters
Canadian jazz composers
Canadian women jazz singers
Musicians from British Columbia
People from Chilliwack
Juno Award for Vocal Jazz Album of the Year winners
21st-century trumpeters
21st-century Canadian women singers
1983 births
Canadian people of Swedish descent
Women trumpeters
Canadian women composers
Okeh Records artists